The Junior Eurovision Song Contest 2021 was the 19th edition of the annual Junior Eurovision Song Contest, organised by France Télévisions and the European Broadcasting Union (EBU). This was the first time the contest was held in France, as well as the first Eurovision event to be held in the country since Eurovision Young Dancers 1999 in Lyon and the first to be held in Paris since Eurovision Young Dancers 1989.

For the first time in 19 editions,  did not participate, as the country's broadcaster is under a three-year suspension from the EBU, making the  the only country to participate every year since the contest began in 2003.

's Maléna was the winner of the contest with the song "". , host country ,  and  completed the top five, with this being the highest placement for Azerbaijan to date. Meanwhile, the  finished in last place for the first time in the contest's history.  and  also achieved their lowest placings to date, the latter finishing outside the top five for the first time.

Location

On 9 December 2020, it was announced that the contest was set to take place in France in 2021. It was hosted in Paris at La Seine Musicale, a 6,000-seat concert hall located on Île Seguin. The contest was held on 19December, which is the latest date for the contest ever.

Bidding phase and host city selection

Unlike Eurovision's adult version, the winning country originally did not receive the automatic rights to host the next contest. However, for the contests since 2011 (with the exceptions of 2012 and 2018), the winning country has had first refusal on hosting the next competition. Italy used this clause in 2015 to decline to host the contest after their victory in 2014. On 15 October 2017, the EBU announced a return to the original system in 2018, to help provide broadcasters with a greater amount of time to prepare, and to ensure the continuation of the contest into the future.

The French Head of Delegation Alexandra Redde-Amiel had previously stated that France Télévisions was keen to host the contest. Spanish broadcaster Televisión Española (TVE) had also expressed an interest in hosting the contest if they had won the 2020 contest.

On 20 May 2021, during a press conference held by France Télévisions and the EBU, it was confirmed that the contest would be held in Paris. It was the second consecutive time the contest is held in a capital city.

Production

Impact of the COVID-19 pandemic 

Several measures were taken by the organisers in response to the COVID-19 pandemic, particularly the spread of the Omicron variant. Although the live show was held with a full capacity audience wearing masks, the jury show, which took place on 18 December, was held without an audience. The opening ceremony, which took place on 13 December, was held without delegations attending.

In preparation for the event, the EBU had been considering three scenarios in which the contest could be held, which were announced on 24 August. The three scenarios include:
 The event is held with no restrictions, as it was before the COVID-19 pandemic began (scenario A).
 The event is held with social distancing measures in place (scenario B). The Eurovision Song Contest 2021 was held in this scenario.
 The option is provided for acts to compete with their music video if they are unable to travel to Paris (scenario C, which was the option used by Australia in the Eurovision Song Contest 2021) or to compete with a recording of the rehearsals if they are unable to compete in the televised final (this was the option used by Iceland in the Eurovision Song Contest 2021).

Format

Opening and interval acts 
French DJ duo Ofenbach were the opening act for the show. During the interval, Valentina performed a Christmas version of her winning song "". All participants then joined on stage for a rendition of the common song, "Imagine". Barbara Pravi closed the interval with a performance of her song "", with which she represented France in the Eurovision Song Contest 2021.

Presenters 

Carla, Élodie Gossuin and Olivier Minne were the presenters of the show. Carla was also the French entrant in the Junior Eurovision Song Contest 2019. The hosts were revealed during a press conference on 17 November.

Visual design 

The slogan for the contest, Imagine, was revealed on 20 May 2021 during a press conference prior to the Eurovision Song Contest 2021 in Rotterdam, Netherlands. The slogan was chosen as a reference to the previous year's winning song "J'imagine", as well as a way to encourage children to be creative and pursue their dreams.

The official logo and theme artwork for the contest was unveiled on 24 August 2021. The artwork was inspired by three themes: imagination, Christmas and the Eiffel Tower.

Postcards 
Contestants were featured in "postcard" video introductions, set in a different location in Paris, or surrounding areas in France. Each began with a short clip of the upcoming performer flying over the skies of Paris via green screen, followed by an extended sequence involving dance troupes dancing in a specific Parisian location. Following that, a stream of light in the colours of the upcoming country's flag entered La Seine Musicale, and the upcoming participant's face was projected onto the exterior of the venue, signalling the beginning of the upcoming performance.

 Palais Garnier
 Galerie Vivienne
 Musée Grévin
 La Samaritaine
 Louvre
 Pont de Bir-Hakeim
 Musée des Arts Forains
 Eiffel Tower
 Panthéon
 Palace of Versailles
 Institut du Monde Arabe
 L’Espace Niemeyer
 Galeries Lafayette
 Pont des Arts
 Folies Bergère
 Château de Chantilly
 Musée Condé
 Sacré-Cœur, Paris
 Musée d'Art Moderne de Paris

Participating countries 
On 2 September 2021, 19 countries were confirmed to be participating in the contest, equaling the number of participating countries from 2019. For the first time since the contest's inception,  did not participate, as the country's broadcaster BTRC is in the midst of a three-year suspension from the EBU. This made it the first edition since the 2004 contest to not see any of the previous year's participating countries withdraw voluntarily, as well as the first since 2018 to see the number of participating countries actively increase from the year before. Prior to the event, a digital compilation album featuring all the songs from the 2021 contest was put together by the European Broadcasting Union and released by Universal Music Group on 3 December 2021.

The Russian representative, Tanya Mezhentseva, has participated in the Junior Eurovision Song Contest before; she represented Russia in  along with Denberel Oorzhak, finishing in 13th place with the song "A Time for Us". This is only the third case (all of whom have been from Russia) in the competition to feature a returning artist from previous editions after Katya Ryabova (Russia 2009 and 2011) and Lerika (Moldova 2011 and Russia 2012). The Armenian representative, Maléna, was set to participate in 2020 with the song "Why" before Armenia withdrew from the competition.

Detailed voting results 

Below is a summary of all 12 points received from each country's professional juries.

Spokespersons 
The 12 points from the juries were announced live by a spokesperson from each country. Countries that did not provide their own spokesperson had their 12 points announced by a local student from Paris.

 Venetia
 Sandra Gadelia
 Matylda
 Eden
 Céleste
 Arianne
 Liza Gureeva
 Rueben Levi Hackett
 Karina Ignatyan
 Zere
 Alex
 Oleksandr Balabanov
 Angélina
 Suleyman
 Matheu
 Lucía Arcos
 Katie
 Fendi
 Manon

Online voting 
According to the EBU, a total of over 4.3 million valid votes were received during the voting windows.

Other countries 

For a country to be eligible for potential participation in the Junior Eurovision Song Contest, it needs to be an active member of the EBU.

Active EBU members 
Walloon broadcaster RTBF stated in June that participation in the Junior Eurovision Song Contest was considered too expensive.
Eesti Rahvusringhääling (ERR) did not debut at the 2021 contest due to financial issues, but the broadcaster would consider debuting in the coming years.
 Israeli Public Broadcasting Corporation (IPBC) confirmed that they would not be participating in the junior contest due to focusing their efforts on the Eurovision Song Contest.
 Lithuanian Head of Delegation Audrius Giržadas confirmed that broadcaster Lithuanian National Radio and Television (LRT) would not be returning to the contest in 2021, citing low ratings during their time in the contest and the cost of participation.
At a Junior Eurovision press event in May 2021, the EBU stated that they were working to bring the United Kingdom back to the contest, possibly for the 2021 edition. However, the country did not appear on the final list of participants in September.
S4C confirmed their non-participation in February 2021 due to "the current circumstances", implying to the difficulties surrounding the COVID-19 pandemic.

Associate EBU members 

 In August 2021, Australian broadcaster SBS indirectly confirmed that discussions about participation in the 2021 edition were ongoing, suggesting that the country could return after a year of absence due to the COVID-19 pandemic, but did not disclose what their final decision was likely to be. Later that month, the Australian Broadcasting Corporation (ABC), who had organised Australia's participation between 2017 and 2019, confirmed that they would not be participating in the 2021 contest, leaving the door open for SBS to take over if they were so inclined. A day after ABC announced they would not return, SBS stated they had ruled out a return as well. Australia last participated in 2019.

Non-EBU members 

 Belarusian broadcaster BTRC was expelled from the EBU on 1 July, therefore losing the rights to broadcast and participate in the contest unless another Belarusian broadcaster joins the EBU. In August 2021, it was confirmed that the suspension would last for three years, however, the EBU can review it at any point before it expires.

Broadcasts 

Some countries rebroadcast the event several days later in late 2021 or early 2022 like Albania and Portugal during Christmas.

Viewing figures 
According to the EBU, 33 million people watched the Junior Eurovision Song Contest 2021, with a viewing share of 15.6%. France had record high viewing figures for the contest, while the Netherlands had record low viewing figures. For the following countries, viewership information is known:

See also 
 Eurovision Song Contest 2021

Notes

References 

 
2021
2021 in France
2021 song contests
Music festivals in France
December 2021 events in France